Peter Terrin (born 3 October 1968) is a Belgian novelist, and a winner of the European Union Prize for Literature. He is the author of several novels and two collections of short stories.

Biography
Terrin's first novel, Kras ("Scratch") was published in 2001, and his 2003 novel Blanco ("Blank"), described as a "Kafka-like reality breakdown" and translated into Swedish in 2006 was his breakthrough. Knack, a Belgian weekly that Terrin blogged for, described Blanco as the best Dutch-language novel about the father-son relationship since Ferdinand Bordewijk's Karakter. His third novel, Vrouwen en kinderen eerst ("Women and Children First") was published in 2004.

Terrin's 2009 novel De bewaker (translated into English in 2012, "The Guard"), called a "coldly beautiful, dystopian allegory" by Eileen Battersby in The Irish Times, won the European Union Prize for Literature in 2010, and his novel Post mortem won the 2012 AKO Literatuurprijs.

Terrin cites Willem Frederik Hermans as an important influence for his minimalist style, and critics have recognized the influence of J. Bernlef in his prose.

Published books

Novels
Kras ("Scratch"), 2001
Blanco ("Blank"), 2003 (trans. into Swedish)
Vrouwen en kinderen eerst ("Women and Children First"), 2004
De bewaker ("The Guard"), 2009 (trans. into English, Italian, French, German, Slovenian, Hebrew, Hungarian, Romanian, Serbian, Czech, Bulgarian, Croatian, Catalan)
Post mortem, 2012
Monte Carlo, 2014
Yucca, 2016
Patricia, 2018
Al het blauw, 2021

Short stories
De code ("The Code"), 1998
De bijeneters ("The Bee Eaters"), 2006

References

Living people
1968 births
21st-century Belgian novelists
Belgian male novelists
Belgian male short story writers
Belgian short story writers
21st-century short story writers
21st-century Belgian male writers